United States v. Handley,  564 F. Supp. 2d 996 (2008),  was a court case in the United States District Court for the Southern District of Iowa involving obscenity charges stemming from the importation of manga featuring pornographic depictions of fictional minors.

Referring to previous U.S. Supreme Court cases on obscenity and child pornography, he held, "Free Speech Coalition made clear that banned material must meet either the Ferber or Miller standards. There is no dispute the images in this case do not involve real children, thus Ferber is inapplicable." However, Gritzner's ruling was challenged by later case law in United States v. Dean.

Arrest
In May 2006, postal inspectors attained a search warrant for the home of 38-year-old Iowa comic collector Christopher Handley, who was suspected of importing "cartoon images of objectionable content" from Japan. Authorities seized 1,200 items from Handley's home, of which about 80 were deemed "drawings of children being sexually abused". Many of the works had been originally published in Comic LO, a lolicon manga anthology magazine.

In October 2008, the Comic Book Legal Defense Fund became involved in the case as a consultant and financial supporter, with Eric Chase of its United Defense Group providing Handley's legal defense. Chase argued, "there are no actual children. It was all very crude images from a comic book." This was related to obscenity charges involving pornography depicting minors, being applied to a fictional comic book. On this, Chase said, "This prosecution has profound implications in limiting the First Amendment for art and artists, and comics in particular that are on the cutting edge of creativity. It misunderstands the nature of avant-garde art in its historical perspective and is a perversion of anti-obscenity laws." Charles Brownstein of the CBLDF commented: "The government is prosecuting a private collector for the possession of art. In the past, CBLDF has had to defend the First Amendment rights of retailers and artists, but never before have we experienced the federal government attempting to strip a citizen of his freedom because he owned comic books."

Trial
United States district court Judge James E. Gritzner was petitioned to drop some of the charges, but instead ruled that two parts of the PROTECT Act criminalizing certain depictions without having to go through the Miller test were unconstitutionally overbroad. Handley still faced an obscenity charge. The motion was initially heard on June 24, 2008, but was not widely publicized prior to the Fund's involvement. CBLDF board member Neil Gaiman remarked on how this could apply to his work The Doll's House, saying, "if you bought that comic, you could be arrested for it? That's just deeply wrong. Nobody was hurt. The only thing that was hurt were ideas."

Sentencing
Handley entered a guilty plea in May 2009; at Chase's recommendation he accepted a plea bargain believing it highly unlikely a jury would acquit him if shown the images in question.

In February 2010, under the terms of plea, Handley was sentenced to six months in jail. Without the plea, he would have faced a maximum of 15 years in prison and a $250,000 fine. Upon release he was required to undergo three years' supervised release and five years' probation. Under the plea agreement, he is excluded from being required to register as a sex offender.

Later case law
United States v. Dean, a 2011 case in the Eleventh Circuit Court of Appeals, called the overbreadth ruling into question because the Handley case failed to prove that 1466A a(2) and b(2) were substantially overbroad in the context of a facial challenge.

See also
Laws regarding child pornography
Legal status of drawn pornography depicting minors
PROTECT Act of 2003
Lolicon
Censorship

References

External links
 United States District Court Southern District of Iowa Judgment in a Criminal Case United States of America v. Christopher S. Handley Case Number:1:07-cr-00030-001 - Sentencing document
 In the United States District Court for the Southern District of Iowa United States of America Plaintiff, v. Christopher S. Handley Defendant Criminal No. 1:07-cr-00030 Reply Memorandum in Support of Defendant's Motion to Dismiss - Statements in defense of Handley's motion to dismiss the case
 United States of America, Plaintiff, vs. Christopher S. Handley, Defendant. No. 1:07-cr-00030-JEG ORDER - Judge's response to the motions to dismiss

2009 in United States case law
United States district court cases